Edward or Ed Stevens may refer to:

 Edward Stevens (general) (1745–1820), American general in the revolutionary war
 Lumpy Stevens (Edward Stevens, 1735–1819), English cricketer
 Eddie Stevens (Edmund Stevens), musician
 Ed Stevens (baseball) (1925–2012), first baseman in Major League Baseball
 Edward Stevens (rower) (1932–2013), American rower
 Edward Cephas John Stevens (1837–1915), New Zealand politician
 Edward F. Stevens, (1860-1946), American architect and author
 Ed Stevens, a character from the television series Ed
 Edward Stevens (diplomat) (c. 1755-1834), American diplomat and physician

See also
 Edward Stephens (disambiguation)